Anthony John Methuen, 6th Baron Methuen (26 October 1925 – 24 August 1994), was a British peer.

Anthony John Methuen (known always as John) was the second but eldest surviving son of Anthony Methuen, 5th Baron Methuen, by his wife Grace Durning Holt, daughter of Sir Richard Durning Holt, 1st Baronet. He was educated at West Downs School. He succeeded his father in the barony in June 1975.

Lord Methuen died in August 1994, aged 68, and was succeeded by his younger brother Robert.

Arms

References

External links

1925 births
1994 deaths
People educated at West Downs School
John
John
Younger sons of barons